Vendlincourt railway station is a railway station in the municipality of Vendlincourt, in the Swiss canton of Jura. It is located on the standard gauge Porrentruy–Bonfol railway line of Chemins de fer du Jura.

History 
The station was renovated in 2020, including the construction of new  platform with better accessibility for disabled passengers.

Services 
 the following services stop at Vendlincourt:

References

External links 
 
 

Railway stations in the canton of Jura
Chemins de fer du Jura stations